The men's 400 metres event  at the 1981 European Athletics Indoor Championships was held on 21 and 22 February.

Medalists

Results

Heats
First 2 from each heat (Q) qualified directly for the semifinals.

Semifinals
First 2 from each semifinal qualified directly (Q) for the final.

Final

References

400 metres at the European Athletics Indoor Championships
400